Ernest Clayton Lewis (November 20, 1924 – May 28, 1995) was an American football fullback who played for four seasons in the All-America Football Conference (AAFC) for the Chicago Rockets / Hornets from 1946 to 1949. He was drafted by the Philadelphia Eagles in the ninth round (77th overall) of the 1946 NFL Draft, but chose to play in the AAFC instead. He played college football for Colorado.

1924 births
1995 deaths
American football fullbacks
Players of American football from Missouri
Colorado Buffaloes football players
Chicago Rockets players
Chicago Hornets players